The Two-man event of the FIBT World Championships 2015 was held on 27 February–1 March 2015.

Results
The first two runs were started on 27 February at 13:05 and the last two runs on 1 March at 10:30.

References

Two-man